The Galleria, stylized theGalleria and also known as the Houston Galleria, is an upscale mixed-use urban development and shopping mall located in the Uptown District of Houston, Texas, United States. The development consists of a retail complex, as well as the Galleria Office Towers complex, two Westin hotels, and a private health club. The office towers and hotels are separately owned and managed from the mall. The anchor tenants are Neiman Marcus, Nordstrom, Saks Fifth Avenue, and Macy's.

With  of space that includes  of gross leasable area with 400 stores, the Galleria is the largest mall in Texas and the seventh largest shopping mall in the United States.

History 

The idea of an indoor shopping center with a hotel was envisioned in the 1940s by oilman Glenn H. McCarthy where a second phase was to include the Shamrock Hotel; this concept was scrapped right after the Hilton Hotel franchise took over the Shamrock in 1955. Glenn H. McCarthy's abandoned concept would influence Gerald Hines in the late 1960s.

The Galleria was developed by Gerald D. Hines. The Neiman Marcus anchor store opened first, on January 28, 1969. The mall itself opened on November 16, 1970. The new shopping center was modeled after the Galleria Vittorio Emanuele II in Milan, borrowing, as its most distinctive architectural feature, a glazed barrel vault spanning the central axis of the mall. When it opened the mall had 600,000 ft² (56,000 m²) of retail space. The original skylights — which graced among other things a large, floor-level, ice rink, open year-round - had three hanging chandeliers. A connected 400-room hotel was opened in September 1971, the Houston Oaks Hotel (now The Westin Oaks Houston).

The first expansion, known as Galleria II, was begun in 1975 and opened on June 17, 1977. It added 360,000 ft² (33,000 m²) of retail space on two levels, Lord & Taylor and Frost Bros. anchor stores, office space (known as the Galleria Financial Center since the early 1990s). A second hotel also opened as part of Galleria II on November 18, 1977, the 500-room Galleria Plaza Hotel (now The Westin Galleria Houston). Marshall Field's joined the mall in 1979, in a store designed by noted architect Philip Johnson. In 1986, a second major expansion, Galleria III, opened with a new wing to the west of Marshall Field's, anchored by Macy's. Access to Galleria III from the main mall was through the Marshall Field's store limiting the success of the new expansion.  Subsequent solutions to solve the problem with signage and a bypass through the parking garage did not have much success in changing this issue. This brought the mall to almost 1.6 million ft².

In February 1989 the Galleria was 93% occupied, making it the mall with the fifth highest percentage of occupied space in the Houston area.

In 1996 Dayton-Hudson Corporation (now Target Corporation), parent company of Marshall Field's, exited the Texas market and sold its Marshall Field's Texas stores. The San Antonio location was sold to Macy's, and three Houston and Dallas stores to Saks Fifth Avenue.  Saks Fifth Avenue would relocate its Post Oak Boulevard location into the Galleria as a flagship location after extensive renovations. The new Saks Fifth Avenue opened in 1997.

Hines Interests sold the mall in 1999 to a partnership of Urban Shopping Centers, Inc. and institutional funds advised by Walton Street Capital, LLC. The Walton Street affiliated funds separately purchased the office and hotel buildings at this time. Urban, in turn, was purchased by Netherlands-headquartered real estate investment group Rodamco North America, N.V. in 2000. Rodamco sold part of its stake in 2001 to the real estate investment arm of CalPERS as it tried to thwart a hostile takeover by a consortium including Westfield Group and Simon Property Group. Ultimately unsuccessful in preventing the buyout, Rodamco's ownership interest and management operation of the mall was acquired by Simon Property Group in early 2002.

During these rapid ownership changes, development continued on a third expansion of the shopping center, known as Galleria IV. Completed in March 2003, it added  to the south, anchored by Nordstrom and Foley's, as well as an additional 70 stores. Upon completion of Galleria IV, the shopping mall totaled 2.4 million ft² (220,000 m²) of retail space which included many high-end boutiques, such as Rolex, Escada, Ferragamo, Van Cleef & Arpels, Tods, Kenzo, Graff, Hublot, Dolce & Gabbana, Fabrege, Chopard, Christian Dior, DeBeers, Bottega Veneta, Balmain, Alexander McQueen, Tom Ford, Louis Vuitton, Gucci, Kate Spade, Cartier, Carolina Herrera, Ralph Lauren, Giorgio Armani, Jimmy Choo, Bvlgari, Valentino, Coach, Fendi, Chanel, Christofle, Tiffany & Co. Yves Saint Laurent, Burberry, Versace, Prada, Celine, Balenciaga, and Tory Burch.

In January 2005, Lord & Taylor closed their store, with its former space being partially demolished and incorporated into the mall as an additional 100,000 ft² (9,300 m²) of retail space that opened in August 2006. This redevelopment included a Kona Grill, Oceanaire Seafood Room, Del Frisco's Steakhouse, Gigi's Asian Bistro, and nine other retail stores. During the reconstruction, some of the former Lord & Taylor infrastructure was recycled, although a section of catwalks dating back to the Galleria II's 1976 expansion was demolished; this trend was similar to the Galleria IV's expansion in 2002.

In 2005, after the merger of the parent companies of Macy's and Foley's, it was announced that the Macy's store at Sage would remain operational as a full line store and that the existing Foley's would be renamed Macy's in September 2006. The original Macy's continued to operate until 2014 when it was demolished to accommodate the relocation of Saks Fifth Avenue from the old Marshall Field's building into a new state of the art flagship store on the Macy's at Sage site. After the Saks relocation, the Marshall Field's building was altered and reconfigured into smaller shops. These provided direct access to Galleria III and the new Saks Fifth Avenue store.

In 2009, The Rainforest Cafe, a popular theme restaurant, opened near the ice rink, replacing Bennigan's. It closed in 2018 replaced by Footaction USA, Flight 23 and Popbar.

Forbes ranked the Galleria as one of the world's best shopping malls.

In July 2019, Tru Kids announced that one of two Toys "R" Us stores being opened by that company as part of that toy retailer's recovery from Chapter 11 bankruptcy in 2017 and its acquisition by Tru Kids, would be at The Galleria. (the other location was Garden State Plaza in Paramus, New Jersey.) Eschewing the "warehouse" arrangement of previous Toys "R" Us stores, these revamped versions are much smaller, and are centered around open play areas, interactive displays, and areas for special events and birthday parties. It opened on November 27, 2019. However, Tru Kids permanently closed the US Toys "R" Us Store in The Galleria mall in Houston, Texas on January 15, 2021, and the Garden State Plaza mall location in Paramus, New Jersey followed in permanent closure on January 26, 2021, due to losses and unprofitability caused by the COVID-19 pandemic impact on retail as there is now less traffic in US shopping malls compared to pre-COVID-19 levels.

Anchors and stores 

With 35 million annual visitors, The Galleria has constantly been named the most visited attraction in Greater Houston.

Anchors
Macy's (250,000 sq ft., opened 2003 as Foley's, renamed Macy's in 2006)
Neiman Marcus Flagship Store (224,000 sq ft., opened 1969)
Nordstrom (226,000 sq ft., opened 2003)
Saks Fifth Avenue Flagship Store (198,000 sq ft., opened 2017)

Dillard's, which technically is not a part of the Galleria, is located across the street from Neiman Marcus. The store was linked to the Galleria by a pedestrian crosswalk (with a pedestrian-only traffic light at Post Oak Boulevard) until 2018; now people must walk all the way to West Alabama to cross the street (jaywalking here is very common but not recommended due to the danger of crossing a busy street). This location ranks constantly among the highest grossing for Dillard's.

Former anchors
Macy's (Galleria III) (262,600 sq ft., opened 1986, renamed Macy's at Sage 2006, closed and demolished in April 2014)
Lord & Taylor, (opened 1975, closed and incorporated into mall space 2005)
Marshall Field's (210,000 sq ft., 1979-1996 as Marshall Field's, replaced by Saks Fifth Avenue in 1997, incorporated into mall space 2017)

Lodging, offices and entertainment 

The Galleria includes a  ice skating facility with  x  rink. The rink, known as "Polar Ice" and originally built in 1970, was the first ever built inside a mall. The rink is positioned below the mall's central glass atrium which was originally added by Hines to increase the visibility of the stores in the lower level. There is a jogging track on the roof around the atrium with a view to this rink. About 50 restaurants and specialty food stores at all prices and service points are located throughout the Galleria complex. A Nobu was added to the property and opened in June 2018.

Lodging

Two hotels are located directly in the Galleria complex. The 400-room Houston Oaks Hotel opened in September 1971, soon after the opening of the first wing of the Galleria. The 500-room Galleria Plaza Hotel opened on November 18, 1977, soon after the opening the second wing. Both were managed from their opening by Western International Hotels. That chain was renamed Westin Hotels in 1981, and the hotels were renamed The Westin Galleria and The Westin Oaks in 1984.

Offices 
The Galleria has three office towers with Galleria Financial Center acting as the hub of the mall where the shops and offices share a common atrium with glass elevators and offices overlooking the mall below. The Galleria Financial Center is occupied by many financial institutions such as Merrill Lynch, UBS AG, Citigroup, law offices, financial services companies and energy trading companies. The other two office buildings are Post Oak Tower, and the Galleria Tower. Additionally, the Williams Tower is also connected to the mall.

See also

List of largest shopping malls in the United States

References

External links

 

Simon Property Group
Shopping malls established in 1970
Shopping malls in Houston
1970 establishments in Texas